22g Tussi Ghaint Ho is a 2015 Indian-Punjabi political comedy film written by Bhagwant Mann and directed by Vishal Parasher. It stars Bhagwant Mann, Rupan Bal, Upasana Singh, and Jus Reign in prominent roles.

Cast
 Bhagwant Mann as Boota Singh
 Rupan Bal as Rupan
 Pooja Verma as Lovleen
 Jus Reign (Jasmeet Singh Raina) as Jass
 Upasana Singh as Gulabo - Boota's Wife
 Tej Sapru as Bhakhtawar Singh
 Rana Jung Bahadur as Professor
 Ravinder Mand as PA Bansi Sharma
 Tumul Balyan as Rocky
 Tejinder Singh as Constable Milkha singh
 Raghveer Boli as Constable Dara Singh
 Gurpreet Bhangu as Manjeet Kaur

Reception

Box office

Critical response
Punjabi news channel ABP Sanjha reviewed film as a great political satire.

References

External links
Brampton Guardian- Brampton South Asian YouTube sensation hits the big screen

2010s political comedy films
Indian political comedy films
Punjabi-language Indian films
2010s Punjabi-language films
Films set in Punjab, India
2015 films
2015 comedy films